Andrew Penner is a Canadian multi-instrumentalist, performer, composer, actor, sound designer, and producer currently residing in Toronto, Ontario. He is a member of Americana duo Harrow Fair, and folk rock and roll band Sunparlour Players. Penner is also an actor and has appeared in Soulpepper Theatre’s Spoon River and As You Like It, Ghost Quartet (Crows Theatre). He has composed music for Soulpepper Theatre’s Blood Wedding, Stratford Festival’s Grapes of Wrath as well as films Eadweard (film) and Small Town Murder Songs, FX show "Lost Girl" and many others.

Early life
Penner grew up in a Mennonite family on a farm in southern Ontario.

Career

In 2005 Penner formed the band, Sunparlour Players, and in 2007 released their debut album, "Hymns For The Happy". In 2009 they released, Wave North. On the band's 2011 album, Us Little Devils, Penner played eleven instruments. He wrote many songs for the group. In 2014 Sunparlour Players released "The Living Proof" and toured heavily in North America and Europe. 

Penner and his wife Erin Brandenburg are the organizers of Kitchenband, a Toronto theatre collective. The collective has a number of original works including Reesor, Petrichor, Detroit Time Machine and BOBLO, the latter of which earned Penner a Dora Mavor Moore Award in 2013 for outstanding sound design/composition.

Penner appeared in and composed music for Soulpepper Theatre’s 2016 production Blood Wedding, 

Also that year Penner formed a duo, Harrow Fair, with violinist Miranda Mulholland. The pair released an album, Call to Arms. In 2020 Harrow Fair released their sophomore album "Sins We Made".

Penner has created and performed for theatre at The Stratford Festival, Soulpepper, Crows Theatre (**award-winning production of "Ghost Quartet"), CanStage, Native Earth, Obsidian and many others. 

He has either won or been nominated for several awards for this work in theatre and film including the Dora Awards, Toronto Theatre Critics Award, Summerworks Jury Award, Leo Awards ("Eadweard")

References

External links
About — Kitchenband
 — Harrow Fair

Year of birth missing (living people)
Living people
Musicians from Ontario
People from Leamington, Ontario
Canadian composers
Canadian male composers